Nick Wagner (born 4 November 1973) is a Republican politician and member of the Iowa House of Representatives since 2008.

Education
Wagner holds bachelor's and master's degrees from the University of Iowa.

Career
He served on the Marion, Iowa city council before his election to the Iowa House in 2008.

As a member of the Iowa Utilities Board deliberating on the Bakken pipeline, he was asked in February 2016 to recuse himself for a conflict of interest, but refused to do so.

In June 2016 he voted alongside Libby Jacobs in favor and against Chairwoman Geri Huser to allow the controversial construction of the Bakken pipeline to continue.

References

Sources
Iowa Republicans bio of Wagner
Iowa legislature bio of Wagner

1973 births
University of Iowa alumni
Republican Party members of the Iowa House of Representatives
Living people